The following Union Army units and commanders fought in the Battle of Seven Pines on May 31 and June 1, 1862. The Confederate order of battle is listed separately.

Abbreviations used

Military rank
 MG = Major General
 BG = Brigadier General
 Col = Colonel
 Ltc = Lieutenant Colonel
 Maj = Major
 Cpt = Captain
 Lt = Lieutenant

Other
 w = wounded
 mw = mortally wounded
 k = killed

Army of the Potomac

MG George B. McClellan

Chief of Staff: Col Randolph B. Marcy

II Corps

BG Edwin V. Sumner

III Corps

BG Samuel P. Heintzelman

IV Corps

BG Erasmus D. Keyes

V Corps

BG Fitz John Porter

VI Corps

BG William B. Franklin

Reserves

Notes

Sources
 Sears, Stephen W. To the Gates of Richmond: The Peninsula Campaign. New York: Ticknor & Fields, 1992. .
 

American Civil War orders of battle